F. rubra  may refer to:
 Festuca rubra, the red fescue, a grass species found worldwide
 Filipendula rubra, the queen-of-the-prairie, a medicinal and ornamental plant species native to the United States
 Foudia rubra, the Mauritius fody, a bird species endemic to the island of Mauritius

Synonyms
 Frangula rubra, a synonym for Rhamnus rubra, the red buckthorn, a flowering plant species

See also
 Rubra (disambiguation)